The Bronze Cross of Zimbabwe is a gallantry decoration that was instituted in 1981 to replace the Bronze Cross of Rhodesia. It forms part of the Zimbabwean honours system. Recipients of the Bronze Cross of Zimbabwe are entitled to the use of the post-nominal letters BCZ after their name. The ribbon is purple.

Recipients 

 Giles Mutsekwa

External links
 http://bulawayo24.com/index-id-news-sc-national-byo-52107.html

References

Orders, decorations, and medals of Zimbabwe
Courage awards